Inflikted is the debut studio album from Cavalera Conspiracy, the Cavalera brothers' first record together in 12 years - since the release of Roots by Sepultura in 1996.

Album information
Max Cavalera had indicated that the music on Inflikted would be similar to Sepultura's early death/thrash-metal recordings but it would also have a heavy hardcore punk influence. The title track was originally released as a four-track demo entitled "Inflikted (After the Slaughter)" in May 2007, intended as a Soulfly track before being repurposed for the first Cavalera Conspiracy album.

The album was released on March 24, 2008. Two videos for "Sanctuary" have been made, one of which is a censored version of the other. Both of these can be found on the band's websites.

In 2008, speaking to Kerrang!, Max Cavalera remembered: "This was a stripped-down album that took me and Igor to our metal roots. It's like thrash, death metal and hardcore punk all rolled up, and it was easy because that's the stuff we like. It's the very heart of what Igor and I are about. The passion of metal and punk will never die. It was a new start for me and Igor - our first music together for 12 years and such a positive and emotional experience. We got over those nerves, and ended up having a great time making that album. Sometimes Igor would play so hard his wife wondered if he was on coke... It has a quality that is pure Max and Igor, not Soulfly or Sepultura or anything else out there."

Track listing

Critical reception

Reviews of Inflikted were generally favorable, with Adrien Begrand of PopMatters stating "Sure, it's not a Sepultura reunion, but having Max and Igor performing on record for the first time in a dozen years is as close as we'll ever get, and not only does Cavalera Conspiracy's Inflikted revisit the post-thrash sounds of 1993s Chaos A.D., but it manages to outshine anything Sepultura has put out in the last dozen years." Begrand also stated that the band "is as solid a metal supergroup as you'll ever come across, and the album's eleven tracks benefit hugely from the chemistry between the four musicians." Exclaim! magazine described the album as a "whole being fast, thrash-y and intense in ways that neither Soulfly nor Sepultura have managed to be in a while." IGN gave the album a mixed review, saying that Inflikted is a respectable debut, but is "unfortunately afflicted with bad lyrics". Phoenix New Times criticized the collaboration, stating that Inflikted "sounds more like the product of a weekend spent jamming in the garage than the efforts of two vital artists making up for lost time."

As Cavalera Conspiracy is a supergroup, critics also dedicated their reviews to evaluate the performance of musicians individually. Chad Bowar of About.com said that Max's vocals are "very distinctive, and his angry growls are as strong as ever." Eduardo Rivadavia of Allmusic praised Rizzo's contributions, saying that "his otherworldly soloing and inventive melodic lines often serve as the creative catalysts responsible for the most inspired moments," while Duplantier "generally just keeps a low sonic profile and his nose out of trouble". IGN gave similar praise to Rizzo, stating that is his "agile lead guitar playing that keeps the album from sinking into metal monotony in many spots."

Charts

Personnel

Cavalera Conspiracy
 Max Cavalera – lead vocals, rhythm guitar, production, art direction
 Marc Rizzo – lead and rhythm guitar, additional vocals on "Sanctuary"
 Joe Duplantier – bass guitar, rhythm guitar on "Inflikted", "Black Ark" and "Ultra-Violent", additional vocals on "Black Ark" and "Ultra-Violent"
 Igor Cavalera – drums, percussion, recording on "Must Kill" (outro), art direction, logo design

Additional musicians
 Richie Cavalera – vocals on "Black Ark"
 Rex Brown – bass guitar on "Ultra-Violent"

Production
 Logan Mader – co-production, recording, mixing, mastering
 Kanky Lora – additional Pro Tools
 Michael Rashmawi – additional Pro Tools
 Tim Laud – additional vocal tracking
 Dennis Graef – additional vocal tracking
 Ingo Schulz – additional vocal tracking
 Laima Leyton – recording on "Must Kill" (outro), logo design

Management
 Monte Conner – A&R
 Gloria Cavalera – management for Oasis Management
 Christina Stojanovic – management assisting
 Rod MacSween – booking for International Talent Booking (ITB)
 Steve Zapp – booking for International Talent Booking (ITB)
 Ian Sales – booking for International Talent Booking (ITB)
 Justin Hirschman – booking for Artist Group International (North America only)
 Laurie Soriano – representing for Davis Shapiro Lewit & Hayes, LLP
 Jeff Leven – representing for Davis Shapiro Lewit & Hayes, LLP

Artwork
 Sandrine Pelletier – art direction
 Surface To Air – art direction, design
 Santiago Marotto – photography
 Jens Howorka – back cover photography
 Kevin Estrada – band in-studio photography
 Charles Dooher – creative director

References

Cavalera Conspiracy albums
2008 debut albums
Roadrunner Records albums
Albums produced by Logan Mader